2009 Regional League Division 2 North Eastern Region is the 3rd Level League in Thailand. In 2009, contains 12 clubs from North Eastern region.

The league winners qualify for the end of season Regional Championships with the other four league winners in the Regional setup.

Ubon United FC withdrew from the league after playing 16 games, due to a dispute with the Thailand Football Association (FAT). All results were declared null and void. Ubon were also given a 2-year ban from competing. The league table was re-adjusted accordingly, after FAT previously thought about awarding 2-0 victories for the remaining games.

Member clubs & locations

 Ubon United FC withdrew on the 16th matchday

Final league table

Results

See also
 2009 Regional League Division 2 Northern Region
 2009 Regional League Division 2 Central & Eastern Region
 2009 Regional League Division 2 Bangkok Metropolitan Region
 2009 Regional League Division 2 Southern Region

References

External links
  Football Association of Thailand

Regional League North-East Division seasons
North